Gadigarevula is a village in Gadivemula mandala, Nandyal taluka, in the Kurnool district of India.

Villages in Kurnool district